Jan Peter Peumans (born 6 January 1951 in Maastricht) is a Belgian politician from the Flemish province of Limburg. Being part of the Flemish Movement, he was at a young age already member of the Volksunie. He seated for that party in the Limburgish provincial council and is since 2004, a Flemish Parliament member for the New Flemish Alliance (N-VA). In July 2004, he opposed, as Mayor of Riemst, the lengthening of the runway at Liège Airport. From 2007 until 2009, he was N-VA fraction leader in the Flemish Parliament. After the elections of 7 June 2009 (which was successful for his party; and with more than 27.000 Limburgish preference votes for him), he became President of the Flemish Parliament, succeeding Marleen Vanderpoorten.

In the Flemish Parliament, he worked e.g. on the case of the Antwerp Oosterweel connection. Peumans was elected most hard-working member of the Parliament in the period 2004–2009, by the newspaper De Standaard.

On 27 January 2010, Peumans caused controversy after he was absent during a reception at the royal palace. As convinced republican he refuses to go to receptions at the king's palace, although he talked to him once on the occasion of the day of the Flemish Community.

On 12 September 2010, he was in Visé (just across the language border in Wallonia, close to where he lives), where he claims to have been insulted and attacked by a local because "he had no business in Wallonia". Peumans said afterwards he never expected he would be attacked due to his political points of view. His statement is being disputed by the alleged attacker.

Political career 
1983–1994: Schepen in Riemst
1985–1987: Councillor in Limburg
1991–2004: Councillor in Limburg
1995–2006: Mayor of Riemst
2004–2019: Member of the Flemish Parliament
2007–2012: Schepen in Riemst
2007–2009: Parliamentary group leader for the New Flemish Alliance in the Flemish Parliament
2008–2009: Vice President New Flemish Alliance
2009–2019: President of the Flemish Parliament

References

1951 births
Flemish politicians
Living people
Members of the Flemish Parliament
New Flemish Alliance politicians
Politicians from Maastricht
KU Leuven alumni
21st-century Belgian politicians